Nora Persson (born 10 February 1999) is a Swedish handball player who plays for Aarhus United in the Damehåndboldligaen and the Swedish national team.

She made her debut on the Swedish national team on 20 March 2022, against Iceland.

References

1999 births
Living people
Swedish female handball players
People from Lund Municipality
Sportspeople from Skåne County
21st-century Swedish women